Reginald Henry Urwick (1876 – 25 February 1964) was a British philatelist who was added to the Roll of Distinguished Philatelists in 1962.

References

Signatories to the Roll of Distinguished Philatelists
1876 births
1964 deaths
British philatelists